The Arizona Heatwave were an American women's soccer team, founded in 2003, which played in the USL W-League for three years, until 2005, when they left the league and the franchise was terminated.

The Heatwave played their home games in the stadium at Sandra Day O'Connor High School in the city of Glendale, Arizona. The team's colors were green and white.

Final Squad
vs Denver Lady Cougars, 15 July 2005

Year-by-year

Notable former players
  Amy LePeilbet

Coaches
  Manny Arias 2005

Stadia
 Stadium at Dobson High School, Mesa, Arizona 2003
 Stadium at Scottsdale Community College, Scottsdale, Arizona 2004
 Mesa Sports Complex, Mesa, Arizona 2004 (1 game)
 Stadium at Sandra Day O'Connor High School, Glendale, Arizona 2005

External links
 Page at USL Soccer
 The W-League (USL) (1995-2005) - American Soccer History Archives

Women's soccer clubs in the United States
Soccer clubs in Arizona
Defunct USL W-League (1995–2015) teams
2003 establishments in Arizona
2005 disestablishments in Arizona
Association football clubs established in 2003
Association football clubs disestablished in 2005
Sports in Mesa, Arizona
Sports in Scottsdale, Arizona
Sports in Glendale, Arizona
Women's sports in Arizona